Leonidas Tapia (?-1977) was a Puebloan potter from Ohkay Owingeh, New Mexico, United States.

Biography
She was the wife of Jose Blas Tapia and mother of Mary Trujillo (born  1937) and Tom Tapia (b. 1946). Leonidas made traditional San Juan polychrome redware bowls, jars and wedding vases. She also made micaceous pottery. Some of the designs she used on her pottery include the water serpent, kiva steps and clouds. Leonidas participated in the Santa Fe Indian Market from 1970-1976.

Tapia’s son, Tom Tapia, learned to make pottery by working with his mother. He works in the sgraffito style and has won numerous awards for his pottery. He also makes pottery with his wife Sue Tapia. Tapia’s daughter, Mary Trujillo, married Helen Cordero’s son, Leonard, from Cochiti Pueblo. She learned to make storyteller figures from her mother-in-law Helen who was the first and most famous maker of Cochiti storytellers and has won numerous awards.

Further reading
Barry, John - American Indian Pottery.  1984.
Schaaf, Gregory - Pueblo Indian Pottery: 750 Artist Biographies.  2000.
Trimble, Stephen - Talking with the Clay: The Art of Pueblo Pottery.  1987.

External links
 Pottery by Leonidas Tapia at the Holmes Museum of Anthropology

References

1977 deaths
American women ceramists
American ceramists
Artists from New Mexico
Native American potters
Pueblo people
20th-century American women artists
Native American women artists
Women potters
People from Ohkay Owingeh, New Mexico
20th-century ceramists
20th-century Native Americans
1937 births
20th-century Native American women